The Luxembourg Cup is the national knockout cup competition in Luxembourgian football. It was first held in 1922, and has been held annually since, with the exception of the four seasons during the German occupation during Second World War.

Winners

Performances

Performance by club

Performance by town

Performance by canton

References

External links
Luxembourg – List of Cup Finals, RSSSF.com

 
National association football cups
Cup
1921 establishments in Luxembourg
Recurring sporting events established in 1921